Cyperus nyererei is a species of sedge that is native to an area of eastern Africa.

The species was first formally described by the botanist Kåre Arnstein Lye in 1983.

See also
 List of Cyperus species

References

nyererei
Flora of Tanzania
Plants described in 1983
Flora of Malawi
Taxa named by Kåre Arnstein Lye